The following is a List of California Civil War Confederate Units that were active between 1861 – 1866. Although California stayed in the Union, it was divided in its politics like many of the Border States. The southern part of the state had the majority of the southern sympathizers.

In 1861, Los Angeles and El Monte formed two secessionist militia units.  Following the Federals success at securing California most of the Southerners who still wished to fight left for the east overland via Mexico, New Mexico Territory or by sea to reach the Confederacy.  However late in the war two units of partisan rangers appeared within the state but had little success; one was dispersed and the other became an outlaw gang.

Confederate Units
 Los Angeles Mounted Rifles
 Monte Mounted Rifles
 Captain Ingram's Partisan Rangers
 Mason Henry Gang

See also
 List of California Civil War Union units
 List of American Civil War regiments by state
 California in the American Civil War

References

California
Confederate Units